Canthon angustatus is a species of tumblebug from the genus Canthon. It occurs across North, Central, and South America, from Mexico to Peru. The species was originally described by Edgar von Harold in 1867

References

Sources 

 
 
 
 
 
 

Taxa named by Edgar von Harold
Deltochilini